Sports Center Station, is a station of Line 3 of Wuhan Metro. It entered revenue service on December 28, 2015. It is located in Caidian District. This station used to be known as Sports Center North Station during construction. It is near Wuhan Sports Center Stadium.

Station layout

Gallery

References

Wuhan Metro stations
Line 3, Wuhan Metro
Railway stations in China opened in 2015